, also known as Do Not Say Mystery, is a Japanese manga series written and illustrated by Yumi Tamura. It has been serialized in Shogakukan's josei manga magazine Monthly Flowers since November 2017. A television drama adaptation was broadcast on Fuji TV from January to March 2022.

As of June 2022, the manga had over 16 million copies in circulation. In 2022, Don't Call it Mystery won the 67th Shogakukan Manga Award for the general category.

Plot

Media

Manga
Written and illustrated by Yumi Tamura, Don't Call it Mystery was first published as a one-shot in Shogakukan's josei manga magazine Monthly Flowers on November 28, 2016. It started as a serialized manga in the same magazine on November 28, 2017. Shogakukan has collected its chapters into individual tankōbon volumes. The first volume was published on January 10, 2018. As of January 10, 2023, twelve volumes have been released.

At Anime Expo 2022, Seven Seas Entertainment announced that they licensed the series for English publication.

Volume list

Drama
In June 2021, it was announced that the series would be adapted into a drama series, starring Masaki Suda as Totonō Kunō. It was broadcast on Fuji TV from January 10 to March 28, 2022. King Gnu performs the series' theme song . The streaming service Viki added the series to its catalogue in May 2022.

Episode list

Reception
As of July 2021, the manga had over 9 million copies in circulation; by December 2021, the manga had over 13 million copies in circulation; As of June 2022, the manga had over 16 million copies in circulation.

In 2019, the manga was nominated for the 12th Manga Taishō and ranked 2nd with 78 points; in 2020, it was nominated for the 13th award and ranked 6th with 54 points. In 2019, the series was nominated for the 65th Shogakukan Manga Award in the general category; it won the 67th award in the same category, along with Nigatsu no Shōsha, in 2022. It was nominated for the 44th Kodansha Manga Award in the general category in 2020. The manga has been nominated for the 26th Tezuka Osamu Cultural Prize in 2022.

On Takarajimasha's Kono Manga ga Sugoi! list of best manga of 2019 for women readers, the series ranked 2nd; it ranked 4th on the 2020 list; 6th on the 2021 list; and 10th on the 2022 list. The series ranked 24th on the 2019 "Book of the Year" list by Da Vinci magazine; it was 5th on the 2020 list; 2nd on the 2021 list; and 4th on the 2022 list.

References

Further reading

External links
 
 

Detective anime and manga
Fuji TV dramas
Josei manga
Mystery anime and manga
Seven Seas Entertainment titles
Shogakukan manga
Winners of the Shogakukan Manga Award for general manga